Randy Churchill (born December 29, 1960) is a former Canadian stock car racing driver.

Racing career
He competed in 3 races during the inaugural NASCAR SuperTruck Series season in 1995. He achieved a top ten finish at Louisville Motor Speedway. He returned in 1996 for one race but failed to qualify. Churchill also competed in 47 ARCA Racing Series events between 1988 and 2000, achieving 1 win and 19 top ten finishes. He also competed in 3 Hooters Pro Cup Series events in 1998.

Personal life
He is the son of Jerry Churchill, who also competed in NASCAR, his father was also the first non-American driver to compete in NASCAR SuperTruck Series and Randy was the second. Together they are one of only 7 father-son duo to win races in ARCA Racing Series.

Motorsports career results

NASCAR
(key) (Bold – Pole position awarded by qualifying time. Italics – Pole position earned by points standings or practice time. * – Most laps led.)

Craftsman Truck Series

References

External links
 

1960 births
Canadian racing drivers
NASCAR drivers
CARS Tour drivers
ARCA Menards Series drivers
Living people
Sportspeople from Windsor, Ontario
Racing drivers from Ontario